Robert Adcock (born 9 August 1986) is an English badminton player. In 2005, he won the boys' and mixed doubles title at the English National Junior Championships partnered with Edward Foster and Jennifer Wallwork repeating the success with the same partners of the under 17 national championships  in 2003.  In his under 19 year, he also won the boys' and mixed doubles silver medals at the European Junior Championships. He won bronze medal at the 2006 World University Championships in Wuhan, China, in the mixed doubles event partnered with Hayley Connor. In 2007, Adcock competed at the World Championships in Kuala Lumpur, Malaysia in the men's doubles event with Robin Middleton, and in 2008, he competed at the European Championships. Adcock who was partnered with Middleton was defeated in the quarter finals round to the 4th seeded German pair Kristof Hopp and Ingo Kindervater in the straight games.

He also represented England men's team competed at the 2008 Thomas Cup in Jakarta, Indonesia & the European mixed team championships in Denmark in 2007. Adcock was the men's doubles champion at the 2006 Czech International with Middleton, and mixed doubles champion at the 2009 Austrian International tournament with Heather Olver. He retired from professional badminton in 2009 at 22 years old with 5 full senior international caps tor England. His younger brother, Chris Adcock, is also a badminton player.

Personal life 
Robert Adcock and Hayley Connor took their partnership to new levels when they wed in Ascot in 2013.

Achievements

European Junior Championships 
Boys' doubles

Mixed doubles

BWF International Challenge/Series 
Men's doubles

Mixed doubles

  BWF International Challenge tournament
  BWF International Series tournament

References

External links 
 

1986 births
Living people
Sportspeople from Nottinghamshire
English male badminton players